Peter Steen (22 January 1936 – 7 February 2013) was a Danish film actor. Steen was born in Randers, Denmark, and appeared in over 50 films from 1964 onwards. In 2004 Steen won a Bodil Award as best supporting actor for the 2003 film Arven (The Inheritance).

Selected filmography
 To (1964)
 Der var engang (1966)
 Pigen og greven (1966)
 Neighbours (1966)
 Story of Barbara (1967)
 The Olsen Gang (1968)
 The Olsen Gang in a Fix (1969)
 The Olsen Gang in Jutland (1971)
 Lenin, You Rascal, You (1972)
 Going for Broke (1977)
 Crash (1984) TV-series
 Arven (2003)
 Min søsters børn i Ægypten (2004)
 Young Andersen (2005)

References

External links

1936 births
2013 deaths
Danish male film actors
People from Randers
Best Supporting Actor Bodil Award winners
20th-century Danish male actors
21st-century Danish male actors